Frank Edwin Ward (October 7, 1872 – 1953) was an American composer and organist.  Born in Wysox, Pennsylvania, he was the son of author Cyrenus Osborne Ward, and the nephew of Lester Frank Ward.  He was educated at Columbia University, and later served as its organist for some time.  He wrote some works for orchestra and a deal of chamber music in addition to church music, cantatas, and songs.  He was a pupil of Edward MacDowell.

References

External links

1872 births
1953 deaths
American male composers
American composers
Columbia University alumni